Mignon, is a 1915 American silent drama film directed by William Nigh with production supervised by Alexander E. Beyfuss, based on the 1866 opera Mignon that was from the 1795-96 novel Wilhelm Meisters Lehrjahre by Johann Wolfgang von Goethe.

Plot
The nobleman Lothario seduces Musette, the daughter of Giarno, the leader of the nearby Gypsy camp. When Musette learns that Lothario is married and has a baby, Mignon, she jumps off a cliff. For revenge, Giarno kidnaps Mignon. After Lothario's wife dies of grief, Lothario becomes a mad, wandering minstrel.

When Mignon is sixteen, the young nobleman Wilhelm Meister, seeing her mistreatment, buys Mignon from Giarno. Mignon falls in love with Wilhelm, but she believes that he loves the actress Filina. At a fete, Filina locks Mignon, whom Lothario has befriended, into her room. Filina traps Wilhelm into proposing, but as he announces their engagement, Lothario, acting on Mignon's earlier suggestions, sets the castle on fire. Wilhelm rescues Mignon, but because she still believes that he loves Filina, she leaves with Lothario. When an innkeeper recognizes Lothario and shows him a piece of the baby Mignon's belt, Lothario's memory returns. As Mignon has the other piece, she is revealed to be his daughter. Wilhelm finds them, and he and Mignon vow to marry.

Cast
Beatriz Michelena as Mignon
Robert House Peters as Wilhelm Meister
Clara Beyers as Filina
Belle Bennett as Musette
Ernest Joy as Laertes
Emil Krushe as Giarno
Andrew Robson as Lothario
Baby Wallace as Mignon (as a child)
Frank Hollins as Lothario's servant
Mrs. Frank Hollins as Baby Mignon's nurse
Harold B. Meade as Lothario's servant
D. Mitsoras as Innkeeper
William Pike as Frederick
Rollin Warwick as Baron Rosenberg

Uncredited
George Cheseboro
Ted Edlin

References

External links

1915 films
1915 drama films
American silent feature films
Films based on works by Johann Wolfgang von Goethe
Films based on operas
Films set in the 1790s
Films set in Germany
Films set in Italy
American black-and-white films
Silent American drama films
World Film Company films
Works based on Wilhelm Meister's Apprenticeship
Films directed by William Nigh
1910s American films